Nina Kraljić (born 4 April 1992) is a Croatian singer-songwriter and voice actress. She is known for winning season one of The Voice – Najljepši glas Hrvatske and for being a finalist in the Eurovision Song Contest 2016 with the song "Lighthouse". Kraljić is the winner of the Croatian Porin award for Croatia's best new act of 2016. Her debut album Samo was released on September 30, 2016.

Life and career

Early life and career
Nina Kraljić was born in Lipovljani, Croatia on 4 April 1992 to Željko and Irena Kraljić. She has a younger sister Tena. Kraljić's first TV appearance was in 2009 when she entered the Croatian version of Got Talent. She placed tenth in the final stage of the competition. When Kraljić was 14, she left her family to develop her musical expression. She studied opera at a music academy and Croatian studies at the Faculty of Philosophy in Rijeka. She is openly bisexual.

2015–present: Samo

Kraljić competed in the first season of Croatian version of The Voice – Najljepši glas Hrvatske. During her participation she performed the song "Beneath Your Beautiful", "Što te nema", and the Macedonian folk song "Zajdi, zajdi, jasno sonce". Her voice was also recognized by Jacques Houdek, who mentored her to victory, with Kraljić receiving roughly 1 million votes in the final round. She later released her debut single "Zaljuljali smo svijet" (We Swung the World) in June 2015, a modern ballad with ethnic elements.

On 24 February 2016, it was announced by Hrvatska radiotelevizija that Kraljić would represent Croatia in the Eurovision Song Contest 2016 in Stockholm, Sweden. On 9 March 2016, she released her 2016 contest song "Lighthouse". On 17 March 2016, Kraljić won the prestigious Croatian music award Porin for the Best Upcoming Artist in Croatia for 2015. She led Croatia to the Eurovision Song Contest final after for the first time after seven years, coming tenth in the first semi-final with 133 points, and 23rd in the grand final with 73 points. Her debut album Samo (Only) was released on 30 September 2016. Kraljić presented herself as a songwriter with two songs "Lullaby" and "Lay You Down" in English. On 19 August 2016, she announced a collaboration with the Croatian composer Matija Dedić on the song "Što te nema" (Why Are You Not Here) also featured on the album.

In December 2020, Kraljić was announced as one of the fourteen finalists of Dora 2021. She performed the song "Rijeka" (River) which she co-wrote together with Hana Librenjak and Miki Solus and ended up in second place behind Albina with "Tick-Tock". Kraljić also had some technical difficulties during her performance in Dora 2021 and deleted some of her social media profiles.

Filmography

Film

Television

Discography

Studio albums

Singles

References

External links

1992 births
Living people
People from Lipovljani
21st-century Croatian women singers
Croatian pop singers
Croatian voice actresses
Croatian sopranos
Universal Music Group artists
The Voice (franchise) winners
Eurovision Song Contest entrants for Croatia
Eurovision Song Contest entrants of 2016
Bisexual musicians
Croatian LGBT people
21st-century LGBT people